Derevnya razyezda Maksyutovo (Mäqsüt razyezı) is a rural locality (a village) in Donskoy Selsoviet, Belebeyevsky District, Bashkortostan, Russia. The population was 20 as of 2010. There is 1 street.

Geography 
The village is located 19 km southeast of Belebey (the district's administrative centre) by road. Pakhar is the nearest rural locality.

References 

Rural localities in Belebeyevsky District